"Drummer Boy" is a cover of Katherine Davis, Henry Onorati and Harry Simeone's Christmas song "The Little Drummer Boy" by Canadian singer Justin Bieber, featuring American rapper Busta Rhymes, from his second studio album and first Christmas release, Under the Mistletoe (2011). Leaked days before the album's November 1, 2011, date on October 28, 2011, "Drummer Boy" is an uptempo hip-hop techno club track where Bieber sings the original song's lyrics and melody while rapping about himself, poverty and charity. Contemporaneously, the track was met with polarization and confusion from professional critics, who perceived it as bizarre and silly and bastardizing the meaning of the original song. 

In later years, the song has been more well-received, with appreciation toward its weirdness, the unlikeliness of a collaboration between Bieber and Busta Rhymes, and Busta Rhymes' verse. It has made several best-of lists of Christmas songs by publications such as Billboard, as well as worst-of lists by The Guardian and Time Out London. Upon release, the track reached number 89 in Bieber's home country on Billboards Canadian Hot 100, 86 on the U.S. Billboard Hot 100, and was a top-ten hit on the Holiday 100 in the chart's first year. In 2020, "Drummer Boy" was certified gold by the Recording Industry Association of America for sales exceeding 500,000.

Background and release 

Months before Believe (2012), a Christmas album by Justin Bieber, Under the Mistletoe (2011), was released on November 1, 2011, and promoted via donations to several charities, such as Make-A-Wish, Pencils of Promise, and a food bank Bieber's family once depended on named Startford House of Blessing.  The track list, revealed on October 5, 2011, includes several collaborations, such as a duet cover of "All I Want For Christmas is You" with Mariah Carey, "Fa La La" with Boyz II Men and a duet with his mentor Usher "The Christmas Song (Chestnuts Roasting On an Open Fire)".

Under the Mistletoe also includes a Busta Rhymes-featuring cover of "The Little Drummer Boy", originally written by Katherine Davis, Henry Onorati and Harry Simeone, simply named "Drummer Boy". The track has added rap verses written by Bieber and Busta Rhymes, and was produced by Bieber, Kuk Harrell and Sean K, Harrell also credited as vocal producer. The song had been covered over 220 times, most notably by Bing Crosby but also by Carey, Johnny Cash, The Supremes, Stevie Wonder, and Destiny's Child. "Drummer Boy" is Bieber's third collaboration with a notable rapper, after Ludacris with "Baby" and Kanye West and Raekwon with a remix of the My World 2.0 (2010) cut "Runaway Love".

Both "All I Want For Christmas is You" and "Drummer Boy" was leaked on October 28, 2011, only days before the album's release. As part of a November 14, 2011 ITV1 special promoting the album, Bieber performed the rendition with British rapper Tinie Tempah, which was promoted on Twitter by both artists. On November 30, 2011, Busta Rhymes and Bieber performed "Drummer Boy" as part of the annual Rockefeller Center Christmas Tree Lighting Ceremony. Bieber and Busta Rhymes also lip-synced to "Drummer Boy" as part of the NBA's Christmas Opening Day on December 25, 2011. On November 15, 2011, John Waters was reported rapping "Playing for the king / Playing for the title / I'm surprised you didn't hear this in the Bible" expressing admiration for Bieber's album, while leaving the Museum of Modern Art event "Tribute to Pedro Almodóvar" on a subway.

Composition 

"Drummer Boy" is an uptempo synthesizer-heavy hip-hop techno club track driven by a "thumping dance beat". Bieber raps on "Drummer Boy", part of his experimentation with different styles on Under the Mistletoe, as well as plays drums. "Drummer Boy" alternates between Bieber singing the lyrics of "The Little Drummer Boy" and rap verses. Bieber's first rap verse involves him bragging about himself and his skills, analogizing them as Biblical and comparable to Michael Jackson: "Playin for the king, playin for the title, / I'm surprised you didn’t hear this in the Bible. / I'm so tight, I might go psycho. / Christmas time so here's a recital. / I’m so bad like Michael, I know I'm still young but I go I go." His second deals with poverty and charity, recommending that "It’s about time for you to act merrily / It’s about time for you to give to charity". Busta Rhymes' verse is about "exchanging Twitter messages with Mr. Bieber at the holiday dinner table". Analyzed Nate Jones of People, in repeats of "The Little Drummer Boy" melody, "[Bieber] shoots the notes sky-high and rides them down on a shuttle of Mariah Carey melisma."

Commercial performance 
"Drummer Boy" debuted at number two on the U.S. Holiday Digital Song Sales chart on the week of November 19, 2011, the same week the Bieber and Carey duet topped the chart. It then landed on the all-format Holiday 100 at number nine on the week of December 28, 2011, in the chart's first year and the same week Under the Mistletoes title track and lead single went to number one. The same week, "Drummer Boy" re-entered at number 86 on the chart's all-genre all-format Hot 100, debuting on a earlier week at number 99. As of December 16, 2022, the song has had 23 weeks on the Holiday Digital Songs Sales chart. On June 25, 2020, the Recording Industry Association of America certified "Drummer Boy" gold for sales exceeding 500,000 units.

Critical reception

Contemporaneous 

"Drummer Boy" was met with polarization and mystification from reviewers upon its release; critics called it a "a goofy modernized spin", "confusing", weird, and "as awkward as it sounds, but at least it's different". The staff at Idolator expressed themselves speechless, questioning "Seriously, is this genius? Is this ridiculous? We’re really not sure. [...] In the meantime, we'll be listening to this another 20 times." As Matt Stopera of BuzzFeed summarized his opinion, "I can't even handle this. It's just too much." Entertainment Weekly found it Under the Mistletoes worst track, complaining that "Bieber spits some of the looniest white-boy rhymes off the shores of Lonely Island", citing the example, "I'm so tight I might go psycho/Christmas time, so here's a recital."

Some reviewers, however, supported the track, even those who were underwhelmed by the album. The Seattle Post-Intelligencer praised the song as "satisfyingly over the top" and "flipped and tossed in a way never imagined before", highlighting the performances of Bieber and Busta Rhymes: "both Bieber and Rhymes spark such creative surges within each other that it makes one wonder why they did not collaborate on this song sooner." 
Busta Rhymes' contribution was well-received by The Guardians Caroline Sullivan, who generally found the guest stars the "saving grace" of the album, as a "raucous flow". Randy Lewis, a writer for the Los Angeles Times positively commented that the song "injects some adrenalin into that war horse" of an album of "head-scratching fare", and the Financial Times journalist Ludovic Hunter-Tilney claimed "Bieber strikes gold with his bonkers version of 'Drummer Boy' when he goes all B-boy with rapping, Timbaland-style beats and a yo-yo-yo’ing cameo from Busta Rhymes."

As an album by a Christian teenage artist, Under the Mistletoe lyrics received criticism for questionable lyrics, the title track and "Mistletoe" being the most commonly brought-up examples. Some critics felt "Drummer Boy"s modern music genre and incorporation of references to non-Christian holidays and pop culture, such as Chinchilla coats, Twitter, and BlackBerry phones, bastardized the source material's meaning and message. Bieber's pleas of giving to charity was appreciated by some reviewers, including Tris McCall of Inside Jersey, reasoning, "Tennyson he is not, but you can tell the kid means it." Others, as Brian Kirk of the Washington Post summarized, found it insincere, only "encouraging his teen listeners to change the world by giving a can of food". Kirk disagreed with the complaints; he felt that the spirit of the song matched that of the story of the holiday standard, which was about a boy being encouraged by Mary to give a gift however small. As he analysed, "Bieber does the same. He draws in his teen audience with a catchy beat and fun lyrics but then hooks us finally with a call to do what we can to help those in need, even as we are surrounded by the excesses of the holiday season."

Retrospective 
In later years, some publications have claimed "Drummer Boy" to be one of the best all-time Christmas songs. It was ranked 110 on a 2021 list by Parade, and 39 in a piece by Good Housekeeping. Dianna Shen of L'Officiel called it one of the best all-time covers of a Holiday staple. Both she and Good Housekeeping journalists Juliana Labianca and Yaa Bofah favourably labelled the track an "absolute" and "certifiable bop", Labianca and Bofah motivated by its message. The Skinny equivalently described it as a "hell of a banger", elaborating, "it's got all the vital components that make for an alternative Christmas song – superfluous vocal runs, shit-hot bars ('Playing for the king / playing for the title / I'm surprised you didn't hear this in the Bible') and a Busta Rhymes cameo." In terms of holiday hip-hop tracks, it was one of the top 25 in an unranked list by uDiscoverMusic, and the 12th best by Billboard in 2018, which also claimed it to be the fourth-best Justin Bieber deep cut in 2017. The Busta Rhymes-Bieber duet also has a reputation of being one of the most unexpected and odd music collaborations of all time, topping Peoples 2013 list of weirdest holiday duets. It was reported in 2017 to be one of "the best cheesy Christmas songs" by The Times, alongside Madonna's cover of "Santa Baby".

Retrospective critics enjoyed the track's oddball nature and Busta Rhymes' feature. Dan Cairns of The Sunday Times labelled it a "coloratura-crazed take" on the original, Busta Rhymes' presence "knuckle-gnawingly hilarious". Jason Lipshutz called "Drummer Boy" "the wackiest yet most undeniably enjoyable holiday tracks to appear in the past few years". He added, "How can you top a Christmas track that features Busta Bust breathlessly spitting, 'People everywhere and all our Twitter followers/Merry Christmas, Kwanzaa, and happy Hannukkah'? The answer is: you can't." Nate Jones appreciated "that an underage Canadian is duetting with a 39-year-old rapper is the least weird thing about this song" However, he did find Bieber's first verse "oddly egotistical" for a Christmas song, especially with a second verse consisting of "tendentious moralizing". Jones declared Busta "deals with rhymes the way Buster Keaton dealt with trains" and Billboards Sai Cinequemani celebrated his verse as "amusing" and "rapid-fire". Entertainment Weekly, in 2018, listed it as one of the most ridiculous Christmas rap songs ever, suggesting it was only outed in quality by Rhymes's collaboration with Jim Carrey, "Grinch 2000". Hannah Mylrea of NME, less favourably, found its weirdness a downside, encapsulating that it "was just too bizarre to become the next seasonal anthem".

However, the song's ex post facto critical consensus is not without detractors. Gena Kaufman of Glamour called it "one of the most cringey Christmas tunes of all time". It was listed the ninth worst Christmas song by The Guardian and the sixth-worst by Time Out London, which expressed irritation towards Busta's line "eggnog with a little sprinkle of vanilla' like he's at the till in Starbucks" and suggested the rapper should have known better. Maija Kappler, in a 2018 HuffPost retrospective on Under the Mistletoe, despised "Drummer Boy" for its several "unforgivable" elements, citing "the misuse of Busta Rhymes" and "our early-2010s tolerance of white Christian pop stars trying their hand at rap on not one but two different verses". He joked, "The only redeeming element of this song is that it inspired lots of online essays, including one in the Washington City Paper, which included the line: "Rhymes bellowing 'BIEBER, WHAT UP' would make a swell notification noise for when someone you hate text messages you.""

Personnel 
Credits are adapted from liner notes
Justin Bieber – vocals, live drums, producer, songwriter
Busta Rhymes – rap vocals, songwriter
Sean K – producer
Josh Gudwin – recording engineer
Jesus Garnica – assistant audio mixing
Kuk Harrell – vocal producer
Jaycen Joshua – audio mixing
Miguel Lara – assistant recording engineer
Chris "Tek" O'Ryan – recording engineer

Charts

Certifications

Notes

References 

Justin Bieber songs
Busta Rhymes songs
Songs written by Busta Rhymes
2011 songs
Songs about drums
Songs about Jesus